Local elections were held in Quezon City on May 13, 2013 within the Philippine general election. Registered voters of the city elected candidates for the following elective local posts: mayor, vice mayor, district representative, and six councilors at-large for each district.

Like in the previous election, Mayor Herbert Bautista and his running mate Vice Mayor Joy Belmonte of the Liberal Party garnered huge leads over their rivals. Candidates of the Liberal Party won all the congressional seats in the city.

Mayoral election results
Herbert Bautista is the incumbent. Romeo Acebedo was disqualified by the COMELEC for being a nuisance candidate.

  

Notes:
Chang is also affiliated with his local party Better QC and is belatedly nominated by the Ang Kapatiran; he is indicated as an independent on the ballot.

Vice Mayoral election results
Josefina Belmonte is the incumbent. Allan Bantilo and Fermin Idea were disqualified by the COMELEC for being nuisance candidates.

 

Notes:
Jota is also affiliated with the local party Better QC and is belatedly nominated by the Ang Kapatiran; he is indicated as an independent on the ballot.

House of Representative Elections

1st District
Incumbent Vincent "Bingbong" Crisologo is on his last term, having served as Representative of the 1st District from 2004 to 2013. His wife Rita is his party's nominee. However, she lost to Councilor Francisco Calalay.

2nd District
The second district of Quezon City was redistricted into three districts. The district that will continue to carry the "second district" name is the one surrounding the Batasang Pambansa Complex, immediately south of the La Mesa Dam watershed.

Winston Castelo, the incumbent 2nd district representative, is running here.

3rd District
Jorge Banal, Jr. is the incumbent, his opponent is former congressman Matias Defensor Jr.

4th District
Feliciano Belmonte, Jr., the Speaker of the House of Representatives, is the incumbent.

5th District
The 5th district comes from old 2nd district's northernmost area, comprising most of Novaliches.

Actor and councilor Alfred Vargas won against former representatives Mary Ann Susano and Dante Liban and broadcaster Gani Oro.

6th District
The 6th district comprises the old 2nd district's southernmost parts (Balintawak and Tandang Sora areas). Lawyer Christopher "Kit" Belmonte, who ranked second to Winston Castelo in the 2010 polls), is running unopposed.

City Council elections

Summary

Candidates

District 1

|-bgcolor=black
|colspan=8|

District 2

|-bgcolor=black
|colspan=8|

District 3

 
  

  

|-
|bgcolor=black colspan=8|

District 4

|-
|bgcolor=black colspan=8|

District 5

|-
|bgcolor=black colspan=25|

District 6

 

|bgcolor=black colspan=6|

References

2013 Philippine local elections
Elections in Quezon City
Politics of Quezon City
2013 elections in Metro Manila